Malaiyoor Mambattiyan is 1983 Indian Tamil-language vigilante film directed by Rajasekhar, starring Thiagarajan, Saritha and Silk Smita. The film became a blockbuster and established Thigarajan as a star. The film was remade in Hindi by Rajasekhar himself as Gangvaa (1984). In 2011, Thiagarajan remade this film with his son Prashanth, titled as Mambattiyan.

Plot 

There is a group of youngsters in the village headed by Mambattiyan, who lead life in a forest by robbing the rich and distributing the wealth to the poor thus Mambattiyana becomes the local Robin Hood.

Cast 
 Thiagarajan as Mambattiyan
 Saritha as Kannaathaa
 Jaishankar as DSP Ranjith
 Silk Smitha as Gypsy
 Senthamarai as Landlord Sundaralingam
 Goundamani as Landlord Chinna Pannai
 Jayamalini as Sornam
 Sangili Murugan as Duplicate Mambatiyan
 Muthu Bharathi as Oomai Durai
 Senthil as Bullet
 Jayashree
 S. N. Lakshmi
 Vinod Raj as a police officer
 Master Haja Shariff as Kottai Paaku

Production 
Thiagarajan was inspired to make a film on the bandit after he got to hear folk song praising the man for helping the village and hailed as "true Robin Hood".

Soundtrack 
The music was composed by Ilaiyaraaja. The songs "Chinnai Ponnu Selai" and "Kaattu Vazhi" were well received and later reused in its 2011 remake.

Reception 
Jayamanmadhan of Kalki praised the performances of cast, cinematography, music, stunt choreography and direction.

References

External links 
 

1980s Tamil-language films
1980s vigilante films
1983 action films
1983 films
Fictional portrayals of the Tamil Nadu Police
Films directed by Rajasekhar (director)
Films scored by Ilaiyaraaja
Indian action films
Indian vigilante films
Tamil films remade in other languages